Anthony Dominic Ubach (1835–1907) was a Roman Catholic priest and advocate for the education of Native Americans in San Diego, California during the late 19th century. This was organised through the practice of American Boarding Schools for Indigenous people which were later described by some critics as a way to strip them of their spiritual and cultural identities and assimilate them into white American civilisation.

Ubach, a native of Catalonia, in Spain, was the first priest appointed to serve Mission San Diego de Alcalá after California's annexation by the United States. In 1862, President Lincoln had signed an order returning the mission lands to the Catholic Church. Presumably appointed by Bishop Thaddeus Amat—then the Bishop of the Diocese of Monterey-Los Angeles—Ubach arrived in 1866 to find that the mission had been used by the U.S. military for nearly twenty years, and was in a total state of disrepair.

As soon as he arrived, as well as the restoration of the church itself, Ubach sought ways to provide "vocational training" to the young Native Americans of the mission. At that time, there was no efforts made by the U.S. government for the education of Native Americans, and for nearly twenty years, he had to rely on private resources, mostly the Presbyterian mission office. By the time they ceased to provide aid, a national office of the Catholic Church dedicated to the colonization of Blacks and Native Americans had been established. This office had come about through the work of Mother (later Saint) Katherine Drexel.

For this work, three schools were eventually founded, and were run by the Sisters of St. Joseph of Carondelet, whom Ubach met when they passed through San Diego on their way to Arizona, their first establishment in the region.

Ubach served as pastor of the mission until his death in 1907.

Sources

 Teresa Baksh McNeil. 1988. "St. Anthony's Indian School in San Diego, 1886-1907." Journal of San Diego History.

1907 deaths
American clergy
1835 births
19th-century American Roman Catholic priests